Tammy A. Vincent was a teenage runaway who was murdered in September, 1979. Her body was not identified until 2007, twenty-eight years after her death. It was previously believed she may have been a victim of the notorious Green River killings. Vincent's case has not been officially solved. NCIS cast member Pauley Perrette collaborated with the popular television show America's Most Wanted in 2009 to work on solving the case.

Circumstances
Tammy Vincent grew up on a farm in Okanogan County, Washington - roughly 140 miles northeast of Seattle. She was described as a headstrong girl with an adventurous streak.   In her teenage years, Vincent fought with her parents and ran away from home multiple times, often disappearing for weeks at a stretch. She left home permanently in the fall of 1978, ending up in a foster home in Spokane and then as a prostitute in Seattle. In August 1979, she was picked up during a vice raid along with several others, and, in exchange for immunity, agreed to testify against her employers - five men who were under investigation in King County, Washington for operating businesses which were fronts for prostitution and "tease and rip joints".

Two days after the raid, she was relocated from SeaTac to Spokane in an attempt to keep her away from the suspects, but a lawyer working for the five defendants tracked her down and turned her over to his clients. She was last seen in Seattle on Sept. 10, 1979, at a motel in the 19200 block of Aurora Avenue North, getting into a silver Lincoln Continental that belonged to one of her employers.  One day later, a King County Superior Judge signed a protective order that identified Vincent as a material witness and ordered her held to testify in the prostitution and racketeering case against her employers.  She never showed up in court.  The last time her family saw her was in the summer of 1979, when she arrived at the family home in a car with someone else. Her family heard from her again that summer when she called on the phone; she indicated that her life was in danger and that she wanted to come home.  Her family never heard from her again.   It is believed that she was driven to California and put to work at the Palace Theater at 53 Turk Street in San Francisco.  A salesclerk at a Woolworth's near the Palace Theater remembered seeing a girl who matched Vincent's description on the evening before the murder. The girl was with a Caucasian man wearing a white leisure suit. The salesclerk told police that the man bought acetone, paint, and an awl.

Murder

A group of joggers discovered the body on the morning of September 26, 1979, on a beach at Blackie's Pasture in Tiburon, California. There was gravel embedded in Vincent's face, suggesting she may have been knocked down in a nearby parking lot. Her attacker began with an awl, inflicting 43 stab wounds in Vincent's chest and back as she twisted to escape the assault. Then the killer doused her with paint and acetone, and set her afire in an explosion of hot flame that swiftly seared her face and chest beyond recognition. Vincent was still alive, however, and even got up and ran (or staggered) 20 feet across the beach before collapsing. She was then shot once in the back of the head. A witness reported seeing a bonfire on the beach shortly after 3 a.m., then a blue van speeding away. An awl, two containers of acetone, and a can of black paint were left at the crime scene, as well as a cigarette lighter. A nearby receipt indicated that the awl, solvent containers, and paint had been purchased the night before from a Woolworth's in San Francisco. Upon the discovery of the remains on the beach, examiners could not identify the body, and could only determine her eye color, height, weight, gender, and dental characteristics. At the time of death, she wore a black shirt, beige pants decorated with blue and red, and high heels.

Identification
In efforts to identify Vincent, the body was exhumed in 2002 and was transported to Richmond, Virginia for further examination. The Center for Missing and Exploited Children created a composite image from her skull, which has been done on countless other unidentified decedents. Various other reconstructions have been created prior to the work done by the Center for Missing and Exploited Children. In 2007, DNA samples from Vincent's mother and sister were matched to the DNA of the remains.

Because Vincent's head was severely burned, detectives were unable to collect hair samples; instead, hair from the pubic region was used to carry out the DNA test. She was cremated on August 7, 2007 and was laid to rest by her family later that month. Her ashes were flown from California to her family in Washington by detective Steve Nash, who had worked on the case since 2001.

See also
List of unsolved murders
Murder of Anjelica Castillo, where the victim went 22 years unidentified
Barbara Ann Hackmann Taylor, who went 31 years without identification
Murder of Tammy Alexander, unidentified for 35 years until January 2015.

References

1979 in California
Deaths by firearm in California
Deaths by stabbing in California
Unsolved murders in the United States
Murder in the San Francisco Bay Area
Deaths by person in California
September 1979 events in the United States
1979 murders in the United States
Female murder victims